This is a list of hospitals in Georgia, sorted by hospital name.  According to the American Hospital Directory, there were 187 hospitals in Georgia in 2020.

Acute care hospitals

Long-term and/or rehabilitation hospitals

Military hospitals

Psychiatric and/or chemical dependency hospitals

Veterans Affairs (VA) medical centers
Also see: List of Veterans Affairs medical facilities in Georgia

Closed hospitals

References

Georgia
 
Hospitals